Ingo and INGO may refer to:

People:
Ingo, a given name
Ingemar Johansson (1932-2009), Swedish world champion heavyweight boxer, nicknamed "Ingo"
Ingó Veðurguð, Icelandic singer

Other uses:
International non-governmental organization
Ingo, West Virginia, an unincorporated community
Ingo (brand), a filling station brand in Denmark and Sweden
Ingo (novel), a children's novel by Helen Dunmore
Ingo bike, see Eccentric-hub scooter